Matilde of Bavaria (aft. 21 June 1313 – 2 July 1346) Meißen) was the eldest daughter of Louis IV, Holy Roman Emperor and his first wife Beatrix of Świdnica. Matilde was a member of the House of Wittelsbach.

Family 
Matilde's paternal grandparents were Louis II, Duke of Bavaria and his third wife Matilda of Habsburg. Her maternal grandparents were Bolko I the Strict and his wife Beatrice of Brandenburg. She had two brothers, Louis V, Duke of Bavaria and Stephen II, Duke of Bavaria. Matilde also had two sisters, Anna and Agnes, however they both died young so Matilde was the only surviving daughter.

In 1322, Matilde's mother died, so her father remarried to Margaret II, Countess of Hainault. Matilde gained ten half siblings off her stepmother, including: Louis VI the Roman, William I, Duke of Bavaria, Otto V, Duke of Bavaria, Albert I of Holland, Agnes of Bavaria and Beatrix of Bavaria.

Marriage 
Matilde married May 1323 in Nürnberg to Frederick II, Margrave of Meissen, son of Frederick I, Margrave of Meissen and had 9 children:
 Elisabeth (22 November 1329 – 21 April 1375), married to Friedrich V, Burgrave of Nuremberg.
 Frederick (born and died 1330)
 Frederick III the Strict
 Balthasar
 Beatrix (1 September 1339 – 15 July 1399), nun in Weißenfels
 Louis (25 February 1340 – 17 February 1382), (Bishop of Bamberg)
 William the One-eyed
 Anne (7 August 1345 – 22 March 1363), nun in 
 Clara (born 7 August 1345)

Of the nine children born to Frederick and Matilde, six of them survived infancy. Matilde and Frederick did not get to see any of their children live to adulthood, Matilde died in Meißen on 2 July 1346, aged thirty three. Her husband died three years later, in 1349, aged thirty eight.

Ancestors

Sources 
Mathilde von Wittelsbach

1313 births
1346 deaths
14th-century German women
14th-century German nobility
House of Wittelsbach
Margravines of Meissen
Daughters of emperors
Burials at Altzella Abbey
Children of Louis IV, Holy Roman Emperor
Daughters of kings